The Blekinge stones are four early Elder Futhark runestones found in Blekinge, Sweden:
Björketorp Runestone
Gummarp Runestone
Istaby Runestone
Stentoften Runestone